Political authorities hold positions of power or influence within a system of government.  Although some are exclusive to one or another form of government, many exist within several types.

Cabinet (government)
Minister
Secretary
Secretary of state
Attorney general
Campaign contributors
Head of state
President
Monarch
Emperor
Head of government
Prime minister
Legislatures
Military
Unions
Political parties
One-party system
Dominant-party system
Multi-party system
Voters / populace

Government